Sara Fabel (born Sari Katriina Virtanen) is a Finnish model, illustrator, tattoo artist, and actress.

Early life
Sara Fabel lived her early and late teenage years in Helsinki, Finland studying to become an art educator in Aalto University (then known as Helsinki University of Art and Design). As part of her studies, Fabel partook in an exchange program with Griffith University located in Brisbane, Australia. Sara proceeded to do sub-studied photography and animation during her exchange year. After returning to her country of origin (Finland) Sara taught as a part-time teacher as well as freelanced as an illustrator and model. 2006 Sara Fabel started her notorious lifestyle as a traveling artist.

Career
Fabel began promoting her artwork and modeling through social network platforms such as Facebook, Tumblr and Instagram. By the end of 2010, she had developed a social fan base around her art and modelling. Fabel started traveling, creating contacts with international photographers and artists and becoming involved in artist collaborations and campaigns. 2013 After moving to United States Sara Fabel retired from modeling, while partaking in a production of Anarchy Parlor motion picture as one of the lead actresses. 2013 onwards Fabel has been on hiatus from acting and modeling, focusing on her art.

2007–2012 Sara Fabel's primary residence Australia.

2013–Present Sara Fabel's primary residence USA.

Film
2013 Sara Fabel was cast in the motion picture Anarchy Parlor.

Publications
Sara Fabel has been featured in multiple international publications, which majority are based in Australia and United States. Features on Fabel are focused on covering her career as a model, actor, tattooist or as an artist.

While residing in New Zealand Sara Fabel started branding out as a model and collaborating with local and international artists and photographers. One of these collaborations was T.J. Scott's In the Tub art book  From this point on Fabel's career as a model and internationally published model started developing as she got frequently published in major tattoo industry publications such as Front (magazine). Issue 154, 2011 Picture top 50 hottest tattooed females., inked (magazine), Tattoos Downunder, Custom Tattooz, Tattoo Society and a double cover collectors editions in Bound by Ink.

Fabel has also had multiple features on fashion, street art and fine art publications. ACCLAIM  Diesel – Only the brave, Culture magazine (Australia), Me Naiset (Finland), Reykjavik Boulevard (Iceland), Sinical (International) and multiple other publications.

Charity work
Sara Fabel has been active in participating in fundraising for cancer awareness with T.J. Scott in the tub projects, as well as working with Peter Coulson, an Australian internationally awarded fine art photographer. Coulsons book In my pants the Book  received Australian government funding to aid in fundraising for cancer awareness.

Sara Fabel has been an active in publicly showing her support towards animal rights. Fabel has used her social media following in gaining awareness for domestic animal abuse issues such as declawing. 2015 Sara Fabel was selected as the face of  fundraising project to support and fund animal shelters.

Associated artist
Kevin Llewellyn Modelling collaboration featured in Kat Von D's Wonderland gallery.
Mike Giant

Hell has NO fury
Hell has NO fury is Sara Fabel's brand (Clothing, art) that promotes self-awareness along with Atheistic and Agnostic belief system.

References

External links
Official website

1986 births
Finnish female models
Tattoo artists
Finnish emigrants to the United States
Living people
Finnish expatriates in Australia
Models from Helsinki